Country Code: +373 5 / +373 2 (partial)
International Call Prefix: 
Trunk Prefix: 

Telephone numbers in Transnistria use several ranges owned by Moldova.

Format: +373 XXXX XXXX

References

Transnistria
Transnistria-related lists